Basil William Robinson, FBA, FSA, FRAS (20 June 1912 – 29 December 2005) was a British art scholar and author, specializing in Asian art and history.

Life

Robinson was born in London, and attended Winchester College and Corpus Christi College, Oxford.  He joined the staff of the Victoria and Albert Museum in 1939 and was shortly afterwards transferred to the Department of Metalwork where, apart from war service in the East from 1939 to 1946, he spent the rest of his career. He served as Keeper of the Department of Metalwork from 1966 until his retirement in 1972.

In 1967 he was elected honorary president of the To-ken Society of Great Britain and was president of the Royal Asiatic Society from 1970 to 1973. He was a Fellow of the Society of Antiquaries and a Fellow of the British Academy.

His principal fields of scholarship were: Persian miniature paintings (he developed the standard classification and chronology), Japanese swords, and the artist Utagawa Kuniyoshi (he established the artist's place among the great masters of ukiyo-e).

He died in 2005. He had married twice: firstly Mary Stewart, who died in 1954, and secondly Oriel Steel, with whom he had a son and a daughter.

Works
Robinson's publications include:
 Robinson, B. W., Islamic art in the Keir collection, London, Boston, Faber and Faber, 1988
 Robinson, B. W., Islamic painting and the arts of the book, London, Faber and Faber, 1976
 Diba, Layla, S., Maryam Ekhtiar with essays by B.W. Robinson, Royal Persian paintings, the Qajar epoch, 1785-1925, Brooklyn, N.Y., Brooklyn Museum, 1998
 Robinson, B. W., Japanese sword-fittings and associated metalwork, Genève, Collections Baur, 1980 
 Robinson, Basil W., Orient d'un collectionneur: miniatures persanes, textiles, céramiques, orfèvrerie rassemblés par Jean Pozzi, collections du Musée d'art et d'histoire, Genève, du Musée historique des tissus, 1992 
 Robinson, B. W., Persian paintings in the India Office Library, a descriptive catalogue, London, Sotheby Parke Bernet, 1976
 Robinson, B. W., Persian paintings in the John Rylands Library, a descriptive catalogue, John Rylands University Library of Manchester, 1980 
 Khalili, Nasser D., B.W. Robinson and Tim Stanley, Nasser D. Khalili Collection of Islamic Art, Lacquer of the Islamic lands, Oxford University Press, 1996
 Omar Khayyam, Rubaiyat of Omar Khayyam, Persian miniatures, translation by Edward Fitzgerald, notes by B. W. Robinson, New York, Crescent Books, 1979 
 Robinson, B. W., Arms and armour of old Japan, London, Her Majesty's Stationery Office, 1951
 Robinson, B. W., Arts of the Japanese sword, London, Faber and Faber, 1961
 Robinson, B. W., Arts of the Japanese sword, 2nd ed., London, Faber and Faber, 1970
 Robinson, B. W., Chinese cloisonné enamels, London, Her Majesty's Stationery Office, 1972 
 Robinson, B. W., Descriptive catalogue of the Persian paintings in the Bodleian Library, Oxford, Clarendon Press, 1958 
 Robinson, B. W., Fifteenth-century Persian painting, problems and issues, New York : New York University Press, 1991 
 Robinson, B. W., Hiroshige, New York, Barnes & Noble, 1964 
 Robinson, B.W., "Hiroshige", Paris, marabout université, 1963
 Robinson, B. W., The John Rylands Lalā wa Majnūn and the Bodleian Nawāʻī of 1485; a royal Timurid manuscript, Manchester, 1954 
 Robinson, B. W., Kuniyoshi, London, Her Majesty's Stationery Office, 1961 
 Robinson, B. W., Kuniyoshi, ein Meister des japanischen Farbholzschnitts, Essen, Burkhard-Verlag, 1963 
 Robinson, B. W., Kuniyoshi, the warrior-prints, Ithaca, N.Y., Cornell University Press, 1982
 Robinson, B. W. and Basil Gray, Persian art of the book: catalogue of an exhibition held at the Bodleian Library to mark the sixth International Congress of Iranian Art and Archaeology, Oxford, Bodleian Library, 1972  
 Robinson, B. W., Persian drawings from the 14th through the 19th century, Boston, Little, Brown, 1976
 Robinson, B. W., Persian miniature painting from collections in the British Isles, London, Her Majesty's Stationery Office, 1967 
 Robinson, B. W., Persian miniatures, New York, Citadel Press, 1957 
 Robinson, B. W., Les Plus beaux dessins persans, Paris, Éditions du Chêne, 1966 
 Robinson, B. W., Primer of Japanese sword-blades, Leatherhead, Surrey, Dyer, the Printer, 1955
 Robinson, B. W., Some illustrated Persian manuscripts in the John Rylands Library, Manchester, [n.d.]
 Robinson, B. W., Studies in Persian art, London, Pindar Press, 1993

References

 Kennedy, Robin, In memoriam, B. W. Robinson, Andon 80, 2006, pp. 48–50.
 Waterhouse, David, B. W. Robinson (1912-2005), Curator and Collector, Impressions, No. 28, 2006-2007, pp. 100–103.

1912 births
2005 deaths
People educated at Winchester College
Alumni of Corpus Christi College, Oxford
English art historians
English orientalists
English curators
British Japanologists
People associated with the Victoria and Albert Museum
Fellows of the Society of Antiquaries of London
Presidents of the Royal Asiatic Society
Fellows of the British Academy